The knockout stage of the 2005–06 UEFA Cup began on 15 February 2006, and concluded with the final at the Philips Stadion in Eindhoven, Netherlands, on 10 May 2006. The final phase involved the 24 teams that finished in the top three in each group in the group stage and the eight teams that finished in third place in the UEFA Champions League group stage.

Each tie in the final phase, apart from the final, was played over two legs, with each team playing one leg at home. The team that had the higher aggregate score over the two legs progressed to the next round. In the event that aggregate scores finished level, the team that scored more goals away from home over the two legs progressed. If away goals are also equal, 30 minutes of extra time were played. If goals were scored during extra time and the aggregate score was still level, the visiting team qualified by virtue of more away goals scored. If no goals were scored during extra time, there would be a penalty shootout after extra time.

In the final, the tie was played over just one leg at a neutral venue. If scores were level at the end of normal time in the final, extra time was played, followed by penalties if scores had remained tied.

Seedings
In the draw for the Round of 32, matches were played between the winner of one group and the third-placed team of a different group, and between the runners-up of one group and the third-placed team from a Champions League group. The only restriction on the drawing of teams in the Round of 32 was that the teams must not be from the same national association or have played in the same group in the group stages. From the Round of 16 onwards, these restrictions did not apply.

Bracket

Round of 32
The top three teams from each group were joined by the eight teams which finished third in their groups in the Champions League.

|}

First leg

Second leg

Strasbourg won 2–0 on aggregate.

2–2 on aggregate. Middlesbrough won on away goals.

2–2 on aggregate. Palermo won on away goals.

Steaua București won 3–2 on aggregate.

Sevilla won 3–0 on aggregate.

Marseille won 2–1 on aggregate.

Rapid București won 3–0 on aggregate.

Basel won 2–1 on aggregate.

Udinese won 3–1 on aggregate.

Zenit Saint Petersburg won 4–1 on aggregate.

Roma won 4–2 on aggregate.

Schalke 04 won 5–1 on aggregate.

Lille won 3–2 on aggregate.

Hamburg won 2–1 on aggregate.

Real Betis won 3–2 on aggregate.

Levski Sofia won 3–0 on aggregate.

Round of 16

|}

First leg

Second leg

3–3 on aggregate, Rapid București won on away goals.

Basel won 4–2 on aggregate.

2–2 on aggregate, Middlesbrough won on away goals.

Steaua București won 3–0 on aggregate.

Schalke 04 won 3–1 on aggregate.

Zenit Saint Petersburg won 2–1 on aggregate.

Levski Sofia won 2–1 on aggregate.

Sevilla won 2–1 on aggregate.

Quarter-finals

|}

First leg

Second leg

Sevilla won 5–2 on aggregate.

Middlesbrough won 4–3 on aggregate.

1–1 on aggregate. Steaua București won on away goals.

Schalke 04 won 4–2 on aggregate.

Semi-finals

|}

First leg

Second leg

Sevilla won 1–0 on aggregate.

Middlesbrough won 4–3 on aggregate.

Final

External links
UEFA.com page
rsssf.com page

4
UEFA Cup knockout phases